Emma Kerr-Carpenter is an American politician serving as a member of the Montana House of Representatives from the 49th district. She was appointed to the House on July 10, 2018, succeeding Kelly McCarthy.

Early life and education 
Kerr-Carpenter was born in Watertown, New York. She earned a Bachelor of Arts degree in international relations and religion from Boston University.

Career 
After graduating from college, Kerr-Carpenter taught English in Belo Horizonte, Brazil. She then relocated to Billings, Montana, where she became a family support specialist for the Family Support Network. She joined Youth Dynamics of Montana in 2015 as a youth case manager and has since worked as the organization's marketing and education coordinator. In 2018, when incumbent representative Kelly McCarthy announced that he was moving to Australia, Kerr-Carpenter was appointed to fill his vacant seat in the Montana House of Representatives. She won a full term in November 2018 and was re-elected in 2020.

Personal life 
Kerr-Carpenter lives in Billings, Montana with her husband, Dan.

References 

People from Watertown, New York
Boston University alumni
Women state legislators in Montana
Democratic Party members of the Montana House of Representatives
Politicians from Billings, Montana
21st-century American politicians
21st-century American women politicians
Living people
Year of birth missing (living people)